Alfred DeGaetano (December 6, 1894 – May 3, 1958) was an American film and television editor. He worked for many years for 20th Century Fox, and was later employed by the Anglo-American Eagle-Lion Films during the late 1940s. From 1953 onwards he worked exclusively in television, editing a number of episodes for different shows.

Partial filmography
 Love and Hate (1916)
 Love Aflame (1917)
 Heart Trouble (1928)
 Oh, For a Man! (1930)
 Charlie Chan Carries On (1931)
 The Black Camel (1931)
 Riders of the Purple Sage (1931)
 Murder in Trinidad (1934)
 Under the Pampas Moon (1935)
 Charlie Chan in Egypt (1935)
 Little Miss Nobody (1936)
 Ramona (1936)
 Midnight Taxi (1937)
 The Lady Escapes (1937)
 Charlie Chan on Broadway (1937)
 Dangerously Yours (1937)
 Scotland Yard (1941)
 Private Nurse (1941)
 Great Guns (1941)
 Lost Honeymoon (1947)
 Stepchild (1947)
 Gas House Kids in Hollywood (1947)
 Raw Deal (1948)
 Man from Texas (1948)
 In This Corner (1948)
 He Walked by Night (1948)

References

Bibliography
 Aubrey Solomon. The Fox Film Corporation, 1915–1935: A History and Filmography. McFarland, 2011.

External links

1894 births
1958 deaths
American film editors